Ha is a Latin alphabet rendition of the Korean family name "하", also often spelled Hah or less commonly as Har. As of the South Korean census of 2000, there were 213,758 people by this name in South Korea, or roughly 0.5% of the population.

Clans 
The bon-gwan, or clan homes, of the three most representative clans include Jinju, Ganghwa, and Aneum, the present-day Hamyang. 

Jinju Ha clan is divided into Shirang branch (시랑공파, 侍郞公波) founded by Ha Gong-jin (하공진, 河拱辰), Sajik branch (사직공파, 司直公波) founded by and Ha Jin (하진, 河珍), and Dangye branch (단계공파, 丹溪公波) founded by Ha Seong (하성, 河成).  Although the three branches seemed to have shared the single common ancestor at one point at least in Silla era, it is unclear which branch was the earliest to emerge. All of the three founders served as the officials during Goryeo era. The clan is sometimes referred as Jinyang Ha clan as Jinyang was the old name for the City of Jinju.  

Ganghwa Ha clan is founded by Ha Il-cheong (하일청, 河一淸), the son of the Joseon official Ha Se-ryeon (하세련, 河世璉). Ha Il-cheong passed the civil official examination in 1570 and later became the governor. The clan's modern population in 2000 was 913.

Aneum Ha clan trace its founder to Ha Cheon-jo (하천조, 河千朝), who passed the civil official examination in 1212 during Goryeo era and served as the country's official. The clan's modern population in 2000 was 171.

Notable people 
The following is a list of notable people with the Korean family name Ha, grouped by area of notability and ordered by year of birth. Names are presented in the form they are given on the respective articles, which may have the family name first or last, or which may be a stage name or pen name. People should only be included in this list if they have their own Wikipedia articles or if they are discussed in a non-trivial fashion in Wikipedia articles on notable groups or events with which they are associated.

Entertainment
Ha Po-gyong (1906–1996), South Korean dancer
Hah Myung-joong (born 1947), South Korean actor, film director, producer, planner, and screenwriter
Ha Yoo-mi (born 1965), South Korean actress
Ha Hee-ra (born 1969), South Korean actress
Ha Ji-won (born 1978), South Korean actress
Ha Jung-woo (born 1978), South Korean actor, film director, screenwriter, and film producer
Ha Dong-hoon (stage name Haha, born 1979), South Korean singer and variety show host
Ha Jae-sook (born 1979), South Korean actress
Ha Dong-kyun (born 1980), South Korean singer
Ha Il-kwon (born 1982), South Korean webcomic artist
Ha Seok-jin (born 1982), South Korean film and television actor
Ha Yeon-joo (born 1987), South Korean actress
Ha Yeon-soo (born 1990), South Korean actress
Ha Sung-woon (born 1994), South Korean singer, member of disbanded boy bands Hotshot and Wanna One
Ha Seung-ri (born 1995), South Korean actress
Gene Ha, Korean-American comic artist
Yerin Ha, Australian actress

Literature
Ha Geun-chan (1931–2007), South Korean writer
Ha Seung-moo (born 1964), South Korean poet, pastor, educator and historical theologian
Ha Seong-nan (born 1967), South Korean writer

Politics and government
Ha Ryun (1347–1416), Joseon politician and Neo-Confucian scholar, educator, and writer
Ha Wiji (1387–1456), Joseon scholar-official

Sport
Ha Jung-won (born 1942), North Korean football player
Ha Hyung-joo (born 1962), South Korean judoka
Ha Jae-hoon (footballer, born 1965), South Korean football player
Ha Su-gyeong (born 1969), South Korean synchronized swimmer
Ha Tae-yeon (born 1976), South Korean wrestler
Ha Jae-hoon (footballer, born 1984), South Korean football player
Ha Dae-sung (born 1985), South Korean football player
Ha Dae-won (born 1985), South Korean football player
Ha Seung-jin (born 1985), South Korean basketball player
Ha Eun-ju (born 1986), South Korean swimmer
Ha Jung-eun (born 1987), South Korean badminton player
Ha Jung-heon (born 1987), South Korean football player
Ha Sung-min (born 1987), South Korean football player 
Ha Tae-kyun (born 1987), South Korean football player
Ha In-ho (born 1989), South Korean footballer
Ha Jun-im (born 1989), South Korean volleyball player
Ha Kang-jin (born 1989), South Korean football player

References 

Surnames
Korea-related lists
Korean-language surnames